Kasioni is a settlement in Kenya's Kitui County. Before the 2009 Constitution of Kenya implemented Counties, it was in the Eastern Province.

References 

Populated places in Eastern Province (Kenya)
Kitui County